The following are the scheduled events of women's association football for 2019 throughout the world.

Events

January
 January 14 – Marc Skinner leaves Birmingham City to become Orlando Pride's coach for the 2019 season.
 January 19 – Alen Stajcic is sacked from Australia following an internal survey, with a number of internationals showing their 'shock' over the decision.
 January 21 – Marta Tejedor is appointed Birmingham City's new coach.
 January 27 – Vivianne Miedema breaks FA WSL's annual scoring record with her 16th goal, with seven games still remaining.

February
 February 18 – Ante Milicic is appointed Australia's coach up to the World Cup.
 February 26 – Martin Sjögren discards the presence of Ada Hegerberg in the World Cup, with the player having renounced to play for Norway since 2017 over differences with NFF.

March
 March 5 – RFEF claims its rights over the LFP-led Primera División and announces its intention to reform it. ACFF, representing all teams in the category except Athletic Bilbao and Barcelona, rejects the initiative while the media reports the competition may break into two parallel competing championships in the 2019–20 season.
 March 15 – FIFA announces the introduction of VAR in the World Cup, marking the system's first use in women's football.  
 March 18 – A crowd of 60,735 see Barcelona beat Atlético Madrid 0–2 in Wanda Metropolitano, setting a new attendance world record in club women's football.
 March 20 – Barclays becomes the first sponsor of the FA WSL starting in the 2019–20 season, with a three-seasons £10 million invest.
 March 27 – Wolfsburg is knocked out of the Champions League by Olympique Lyonnais in a quarterfinals repeat of the previous edition's final, while Chelsea qualifies past PSG with a last-minute goal. Barcelona and Bayern Munich also qualify for the semi-finals.
 March 31 – Chelsea is left with no Champions League-qualifying options but winning the ongoing edition following a home draw against West Ham.

April
 April 1 – Phil Neville asks the Premier League's leading clubs to open their main stadiums to their women's teams before the end of the season.
 April 4 – Alex Morgan scores her 100th goal for the United States with her opener to a 5–3 win over Australia.
 April 8 – Brazil accumulates nine defeats in a row after losing 1–0 to Scotland.
 April 17 – Alex Morgan is one of six sportspeople included in the 2019 Time 100 list.
 April 28 
 Barcelona becomes the first Spanish team to reach the Champions League's final after beating Bayern Munich in both legs. Three last editions champion Olympique Lyonnais overcomes Chelsea in a close tie.
 Arsenal wins its 15th national championship title seven years later, also qualifying for the Champions League for the first time since then.

May
 May 1 – Wolfsburg equals Frankfurt record five consecutive DFB Pokal trophies by defeating Freiburg 1–0 in the final.
 May 2 – Formiga extends at 41 her contract for PSG for one more year.

International WNT competitions
 Inaugural editions are marked in blue. Successful defending champions are marked in yellow.

Official

Invitational

Non-FIFA

International club competitions

Official

National competitions
Confederations are ordered by number of slots awarded for the 2019 FIFA Women's World Cup. Successful defending champions are marked in yellow.

UEFA

AFC

CONCACAF

CAF

CONMEBOL

OFC

References

 
Women's association football by year